The Bird may also refer to:
Finger (gesture), also called flipping the bird, to hold up the middle finger of the hand
The Bird, the official mascot of the Baltimore Orioles